The Honda CB1000 Super Four is a CB series  standard motorcycle made by Honda from 1992 to 1996. In the US, it was only sold from 1994 to 1995. The engine was derived the CBR1000F.

Notes

References 

 
 
 
 
 

CB1000
Standard motorcycles
Motorcycles introduced in 1992